Dehali Dam is an earthfill dam on Tapi river near Sind Kheda in state of Maharashtra in India.

Specifications

Purpose
 Irrigation
 Water Supply

See also
 Dams in Maharashtra
 List of reservoirs and dams in India

References

Dams in Maharashtra
Dams on the Tapti River
Year of establishment missing